Muradxanlı (also, Muradkhanly and Myurakhany) is a village and municipality in the Imishli Rayon of Azerbaijan.  It has a population of 3900

References 

Populated places in Imishli District